Val Liona is a commune in the province of Vicenza, Veneto, Italy.

It was established on 17 February 2017 by the merger of Grancona and San Germano dei Berici.

Sports
Boca Ascesa Val Liona is an Italian association football club, based in this city.

References

External links
Official website